Medicine & Science in Sports & Exercise is a monthly peer-reviewed journal covering research in sports and exercise science. It was established in 1969 and is published by Lippincott Williams & Wilkins on behalf of the American College of Sports Medicine. Its editor-in-chief is Andrew (Andy) Jones, Ph.D., FACSM (University of Exeter)  . 

According to the Journal Citation Reports, the journal has an impact factor of 6.289.

References

External links 
 

Sports medicine journals
Monthly journals
English-language journals
Lippincott Williams & Wilkins academic journals
Publications established in 1969